Krishnendu Paul(born 17 May 1973) is a Bharatiya Janata Party politician from Assam. He was elected to the Assam Legislative Assembly since 2016 from Patharkandi Constituency .

References 

1973 births
Living people
Bharatiya Janata Party politicians from Assam
Assam MLAs 2016–2021
People from Karimganj district
Assam MLAs 2021–2026